Hierodula tenuidentata is a species of praying mantis in the family Mantidae.

Subspecies
These two subspecies belong to the species Hierodula tenuidentata:
 Hierodula tenuidentata darvasica Lindt, 1963
 Hierodula tenuidentata tenuidentata Saussure, 1869

References

tenuidentata
Articles created by Qbugbot
Insects described in 1869